Charles Andrews is Liturgical Organist at Temple Church, London, having been Associate Director of Music, All Saints, Margaret Street from 2011-2016. He studied organ at the Royal College of Music with David Graham and Sophie-Véronique Cauchefer-Choplin, with the support of a Douglas and Kyra Downie Award.

He was Accompanist to Hertfordshire Chorus from 2011-2018. Prior to his appointment at All Saints, Margaret Street he held posts at St John's, Hyde Park, Chelmsford Cathedral, and the Michael James organ scholarship at Rochester Cathedral.

Engagements in 2012 include the premiere of David Briggs Mosaïque for organ duo, with Roger Sayer.

Discography
Duruflé Prélude sur l'Introït de l'Épiphanie op 13 and Toccata op 5 from the album Missa Carolae & Songs of the Nativity, A Christmas Album from Rochester Cathedral
Midas Touch, Roger Sayer and Charles Andrews at the organ of Rochester Cathedral

References

External links
 All Saints Margaret Street
 Home

English organists
British male organists
Alumni of the Royal College of Music
Living people
Year of birth missing (living people)
Place of birth missing (living people)
21st-century organists
21st-century British male musicians